There are 68 listed buildings (Swedish: byggnadsminne) in Västernorrland County.

Härnösand Municipality

Kramfors Municipality

Sollefteå Municipality

Sundsvall Municipality

Timrå Municipality

Ånge Municipality

Örnsköldsvik Municipality
placeholder

External links

  Bebyggelseregistret

Listed buildings in Sweden